= 1999 Slovenian coal power station referendum =

10 January 1999
- Are you in favor of the issue of financing the construction of TET 3 being regulated as proposed by the draft law on providing funds for the co-financing of the construction and on the guarantee of the Republic of Slovenia for borrowing credits for the construction of the Thermal Power Plant Trbovlje 3, namely: provides a part of the funds from the annual budget of the Republic of Slovenia, - The Republic of Slovenia guarantees the obligations from domestic and foreign loans that will be taken out by the Public Company Termoelektrarne Trbovlje; and that the issue of other investment funds is omitted, which the Public Company Termoelektrarne Trbovlje itself does not have, or could only acquire under the condition of permanent state guarantees for the administrative and at the expense of electricity payers, a certain price of electricity at its threshold for the period of construction and for the time operation of TET 3?

Results
Choice	Votes	%
Yes	84,435	20.20%
No	333,478	79.80%
Valid votes	417,913	97.80%
Invalid or blank votes	9,413	2.20%
Total votes	427,326	100.00%
Registered voters/turnout	1,564,170	27.32%

A referendum on building a coal-fired power plant was held in Slovenia on 10 January 1999. Voters were asked whether they approved of the construction of the TET3 coal-fired power plant. The proposal was rejected by 79.8% of voters, although voter turnout was just 27.3%.

== Results ==
Choice	Votes	%
For	84,437	20.20
Against	333,476	79.80
Total	417,913	100.00
Valid votes	417,913	97.80
Invalid/blank votes	9,414	2.20
Total votes	427,327	100.00
Registered voters/turnout	1,564,154	27.32
Source: Nohlen & Stöver
